The discography of the Japanese band TM Network consists of twelve studio albums, twelve compilation albums, and forty one singles released since 1984.

Albums

Studio albums

Extended plays

Live albums

Compilations 
Band release

Label release

Remix albums

Box sets

Singles

Videography

Video games

Footnotes

References

External links 
  (Avex, Inc.)
  (Sony Music Entertainment Japan)

Discographies of Japanese artists
Pop music group discographies
Rock music group discographies